Cutler–Donahoe Bridge is a  covered bridge in Madison County, Iowa. It was built in 1870 by Eli Cox. It originally crossed the North River near Bevington, Iowa. In 1979, the bridge was moved to its location at the entrance to the Winterset City Park.

See also
List of bridges documented by the Historic American Engineering Record in Iowa
List of covered bridges in Madison County, Iowa

References

External links

Covered bridges on the National Register of Historic Places in Iowa
Tourist attractions in Madison County, Iowa
Bridges in Madison County, Iowa
Road bridges in Iowa
Historic American Engineering Record in Iowa
National Register of Historic Places in Madison County, Iowa
Winterset, Iowa
Wooden bridges in Iowa